David Darryl Wilson (born 1970), often known as Darryl David, is a Singaporean politician. A member of the governing People's Action Party (PAP), he has been the Member of Parliament (MP) representing the Ang Mo Kio–Hougang division of Ang Mo Kio GRC since 2015.

Education
David was educated at St. Michael's School, Raffles Institution and Raffles Junior College before graduating from the National University of Singapore with a Bachelor of Arts with honours degree in English literature.  

He subsequently went on to complete a Master of Business Administration degree at Nanyang Technological University and a Master of Public Administration degree at the National University of Singapore's Lee Kuan Yew School of Public Policy.

Career
David started his career as a host of the Channel 5 television game show, The Pyramid Game, in the 1990s. He was Deputy Director of the School of Design at Temasek Polytechnic before joining SJI International School as its chief executive officer in 2017.

In 2009, David became District Councillor of the North East Community Development Council.

Political career
David made his political debut in the 2015 general election as part of a five-member PAP team contesting in Ang Mo Kio GRC and won. 

David was latter appointed as Deputy Chair of the Government Parliamentary Committee for Culture, Community and Youth, and Education. He also sits on the Government Parliamentary Committee for Communications and Information, and Social and Family Development.

In his maiden parliamentary speech, David suggested passing a basic English test and doing mandatory community work as additional criteria to become a Singapore citizen.

During the 2020 Budget debate, David called for more subsidies for after-school care even after children graduate from pre-school.

Personal life
David is a Singaporean of Indian and Chinese descent with his father being an Indian and his mother a Chinese. His parents are divorced and he was raised by his mother. David is bilingual in English and Mandarin but is able to speak conversational Hokkien dialect. 

David was previously married to radio personality Georgina Chang. He has since remarried to lawyer Christina Sim since 2006 and they have two children.

References

External links
 Darryl David on Parliament of Singapore

1970 births
Living people
Members of the Parliament of Singapore
People's Action Party politicians
Singaporean television presenters
Academic staff of Temasek Polytechnic
Nanyang Technological University alumni
Raffles Junior College alumni
Raffles Institution alumni
National University of Singapore alumni